Pascal Mons is a French former professional rugby league footballer who represented France at the 1995 World Cup.

Playing career
Mons played for AS Carcassonne and represented France between 1993 and 1995, including at the 1995 World Cup.

References

Living people
French rugby league players
France national rugby league team players
AS Carcassonne players
Rugby league wingers
Rugby league centres
Year of birth missing (living people)